James Morris Martin (January 8, 1845 – June 16, 1902) was a Canadian politician. He served in the Legislative Assembly of British Columbia from 1899 to 1900 from the electoral district of West Kootenay-Rossland. He was a hardware merchant and two-term mayor of Vernon, British Columbia.

References

1845 births
1902 deaths
Members of the Legislative Assembly of British Columbia
Mayors of places in British Columbia